The Firechasers is a 1971 British crime film directed by Sidney Hayers and starring Chad Everett, Anjanette Comer, and Keith Barron. Its plot concerns an insurance investigator who tries to find out who is behind a series of arson attacks. The film was shot at Pinewood Studios.

Plot
While investigating the cause of a series of lethal fires in London, U.S. insurance man Quentin Barnaby falls in love with beautiful journalist Toby Collins. Working alongside and pooling information with Toby and her photographer, Jim Maxwell, Barnaby hopes they share a common goal, that of "firechasing" the identity of the arsonist responsible.

Cast
 Chad Everett – Quentin Barnaby 
 Anjanette Comer – Toby Collins 
 Keith Barron – Jim Maxwell 
 Joanne Dainton – Valerie Chrane 
 Rupert Davies – Prentice 
 James Hayter – Inspector Herman 
 Robert Flemyng – Carlton 
 Roy Kinnear – Roscoe 
 Allan Cuthbertson – D.O Jarvis 
 John Loder – Routledge

Critical reception
TV Guide called it "so-so entertainment"; while the Radio Times wrote, "director Sidney Hayers keeps up the pace as unlikely insurance investigator Everett hunts an arsonist throughout a London peopled with well-known British character actors."

References

External links
 

1971 films
British crime films
1971 crime films
Films directed by Sidney Hayers
Films scored by Laurie Johnson
Films shot at Pinewood Studios
Films set in London
1970s English-language films
1970s British films